Tiger orchid is a common name for several orchids and may refer to:

Diuris sulphurea, native to eastern Australia
Elleanthus, native to the neotropics
Grammatophyllum speciosum, the world's largest orchid, native to southeast Asia
Maxillaria, native to the neotropics
Rossioglossum grande, native to Central America

Gallery